Dermacentor reticulatus, also known as the ornate cow tick, ornate dog tick, meadow tick, and marsh tick, is a species of tick from the family Ixodidae. It is the type species for the genus Dermacentor.
D. reticulatus is an ornate tick. The female varies in size from 3.8–4.2 mm (unfed) to 10 mm when engorged after feeding. The unfed male is 4.2–4.8 mm long. D. reticulatus is found in Europe and Western Asia, generally in wooded areas.

Lifecycle
D. reticulartus has a three-host development cycle. The adult female remains on a host for 9–15 days, and can lay 3000–4500 eggs, although the total number of eggs depends on the size of the female. The larva hatches from the egg in 14–21 days.

Disease transmission
D. reticulatus is a vector of various disease organisms, including Babesia canis,  Francisella tularensis, Coxiella burnetti, Theileria equi, and several Rickettsia species, such as ''Rickettsia slovaca.

See also
Ticks of domestic animals

References

Ticks
Parasitic arthropods of mammals
Ixodidae
Animals described in 1794